Thomas Calvert may refer to:

 Thomas Calvert (divine) (1606–1679), English Nonconformist divine
 Thomas Calvert (MP) (1755–?) English Member of parliament for St Mawes 1792–1795
 Thomas Calvert (professor) (1775–1840), English Anglican priest and theologian
 Thomas Calvert (Royal Navy officer) (1883–1938), English Royal Navy officer of the First World War